The 2006 Atlas Creek pipeline explosion was a disaster that occurred on 12 May 2006 at Atlas Creek Island (sometimes called Isanki Island), near Lagos, Nigeria, when a pressurized petrol pipeline that had been ruptured by thieves exploded, killing 150 people. The Nigerian Red Cross said that vandals had originally drilled holes into the pipe to steal fuel, and that local people had then come down with jerrycans to fill them with fuel. Approximately five hundred jerrycans were found at the scene of the explosion, which incinerated anyone within a 20-metre radius. Many victims were buried nearby in a mass grave.

Investigation 

The president, Olusegun Obasanjo, ordered a full police investigation.

See also 
 2006 Abule Egba pipeline explosion
 2010 South Kivu tank truck explosion
 2019 Tlahuelilpan pipeline explosion
 List of pipeline accidents
 Gasoline theft

References

Sources 
Scores die in Nigeria fuel blast Scores die in Nigeria fuel blast. Retrieved: 25 September 2011.
Probe ordered after Nigeria blast Retrieved: 25 September 2011.

Explosions in 2006
2006 industrial disasters
Man-made disasters in Nigeria
2006 in Nigeria
Explosions in Nigeria
Pipeline accidents
Deaths caused by petroleum looting
May 2006 events in Nigeria